Raïs Hamidou is a suburb of the city of Algiers in northern Algeria.

Notable people
 Rezki Zerarti, painter, artist

References

Populated places in Algiers Province